Liu Shiying (born 24 September 1993) is a Chinese athlete who competes in the javelin throw. She is the first Asian athlete to win an Olympic gold medal in women's javelin throw.

Career
Born in Muping County, Yantai, Shandong Province, Liu competed in track and field as a teenager and came to prominence nationally with a win at the Chinese City Games.

She had won a gold medal herself at the 2012 Asian Junior Athletics Championships a month earlier.

Liu made a gradual progression into the senior ranks. She was sixth at the 2012 Chinese Athletics Championships, then improved to fourth behind Chang Chunfeng at the 12th Chinese National Games in 2013 with a personal best of  – her first throw beyond sixty metres. She did not compete at a major event in 2014, but a new best throw of  gave her her highest world ranking yet at 21st (behind only Asian Games winner Zhang Li among Asian women).

On 6 August 2021, she won the gold medal in women's javelin throw at 2020 Summer Olympics in Tokyo with 66.34 metres, thereby becoming the first Asian to win an Olympic gold medal in women's javelin throw and the second Chinese athlete to be crowned the Olympic champion in any field event.

On 23 September 2021, she won the gold medal in women's javelin throw at 2021 National Games of China in Shaanxi with 64.33 metres.

International competitions

Seasonal bests

2018: 
2017: 
2016: 
2015: 
2014: 
2013: 
2012: 
2011: 
2010: 

All information from IAAF profile

References

External links

Living people
1993 births
Sportspeople from Yantai
Athletes from Shandong
Chinese female javelin throwers
Olympic athletes of China
Olympic female javelin throwers
Athletes (track and field) at the 2016 Summer Olympics
Athletes (track and field) at the 2020 Summer Olympics
Asian Games gold medalists for China
Asian Games medalists in athletics (track and field)
Athletes (track and field) at the 2018 Asian Games
Medalists at the 2018 Asian Games
World Athletics Championships athletes for China
World Athletics Championships medalists
Asian Games gold medalists in athletics (track and field)
Medalists at the 2020 Summer Olympics
Olympic gold medalists in athletics (track and field)
Olympic gold medalists for China